The Billboard Latin Music Award for Latin Pop Song of the Year (formerly Latin Pop Airplay Track of the Year and Pop Song of the Year) is an honor presented annually at the Billboard Latin Music Awards, a ceremony which honors "the most popular albums, songs, and performers in Latin music, as determined by the actual sales, radio airplay, online streaming and social data that informs Billboards weekly charts." The award is given to the best-performing singles on Billboards Latin Pop Airplay chart, which measures the most popular pop music recordings on Spanish-language radio stations in the United States. The list was established by the magazine on October 8, 1994. From 2003 to 2009, the award was separated into Male, Female, Duo or Group, and New Artist categories.

Cristian Castro and Enrique Iglesias are the most awarded acts in the category with three wins each. Iglesias and Shakira are the most nominated artists with eight nominations each. Only Ricky Martin has won Latin Pop Song of the Year twice in a row. As of 2019, the holders are Reik, Ozuna, and Wisin for the song "Me Niego".

Recipients

Records

Most nominations

Most awards

See also
Latin Grammy Award for Best Pop Song
Lo Nuestro Award for Pop Song of the Year

References

Awards established in 1994
Billboard Latin Music Awards
Song awards
1994 establishments in the United States
Latin pop